"Hitsville U.K." is a song by the English punk rock band the Clash from their 1980 album Sandinista!. A duet between lead guitarist Mick Jones and his then-girlfriend Ellen Foley, it is the second single released from the album.

Composition
The song's title is a nod to Motown Records, which used the moniker "Hitsville U.S.A." in its advertising and to refer to the label's first headquarters in Detroit.

The lyrics refer to the emerging indie scene in British music in the late 1970s and early 1980s, which is held in contrast to the "mutants, creeps and musclemen" of the major labels with their "expense accounts" and "lunch discounts", making "AOR" and using "chart-hyping" to sell their records. References are made to a number of UK independent labels (Lightning, Small Wonder, Rough Trade, Fast Product and Factory).

Release
The original UK single release included "Radio One" by Mikey Dread as the B-side. A second issue, released later in 1981 in the U.S., replaced "Radio One" with "Police on My Back" as the B-side.

Like all other Clash singles, the song is also available on the 1991 compilation The Singles and the 2013 remastered compilation The Clash Hits Back.

Track listing
7" vinyl
 "Hitsville UK" (The Clash) – 4:23
 "Radio One" (Mikey Dread) – 6:20

7" vinyl (North America)
 "Hitsville UK" (The Clash) – 4:23
 "Police On My Back" (Eddy Grant) – 3:16

Personnel
 Ellen Foley – lead vocals
 Mick Jones – lead vocals, piano, organ
 Joe Strummer – guitar
 Norman Watt-Roy – bass guitar
 Topper Headon – drums
 Jody Linscott – percussion, marimba

Charts

References

1980 songs
The Clash songs
Male–female vocal duets
1981 singles
CBS Records singles